Marriage or Mortgage is a reality streaming television series that aired on Netflix on March 10, 2020.

Cast 
 Elliot Schiff
 Goria Cunningham
 Brittany Williams
 Goria Smith
 Precious Styles Bullard
 Scott Williams
 Alex Bullard
 Dorothy Bullard
 Nichole Holmes
 Sarah Miller

References

External links
 
 

2020s American reality television series
English-language Netflix original programming
2020 American television series debuts